Lambulodes albiterminalis is a moth of the family Erebidae. It was described by Max Gaede in 1926. It is found in New Guinea and Papua New Guinea. The species is probably restricted to mountainous areas.

References

Lithosiina
Moths described in 1926